Acetylene (systematic name: ethyne) is the chemical compound with the formula  and structure . It is a hydrocarbon and the simplest alkyne. This colorless gas is widely used as a fuel and a chemical building block. It is unstable in its pure form and thus is usually handled as a solution. Pure acetylene is odorless, but commercial grades usually have a marked odor due to impurities such as divinyl sulfide and phosphine.

As an alkyne, acetylene is unsaturated because its two carbon atoms are bonded together in a triple bond. The carbon–carbon triple bond places all four atoms in the same straight line, with CCH bond angles of 180°.

Discovery
Acetylene was discovered in 1836 by Edmund Davy, who identified it as a "new carburet of hydrogen". It was an accidental discovery while attempting to isolate potassium metal. By heating potassium carbonate with carbon at very high temperatures, he produced a residue of what is now known as potassium carbide, (K2C2), which reacted with water to release the new gas. It was rediscovered in 1860 by French chemist Marcellin Berthelot, who coined the name acétylène. Berthelot's empirical formula for acetylene (C4H2), as well as the alternative name "quadricarbure d'hydrogène" (hydrogen quadricarbide), were incorrect because many chemists at that time used the wrong atomic mass for carbon (6 instead of 12). Berthelot was able to prepare this gas by passing vapours of organic compounds (methanol, ethanol, etc.) through a red hot tube and collecting the effluent. He also found that acetylene was formed by sparking electricity through mixed cyanogen and hydrogen gases. Berthelot later obtained acetylene directly by passing hydrogen between the poles of a carbon arc.

Preparation
Since the 1950s, acetylene has mainly been manufactured by the partial combustion of methane. It is a recovered side product in production of ethylene by cracking of hydrocarbons. Approximately 400,000 tonnes were produced by this method in 1983. Its presence in ethylene is usually undesirable because of its explosive character and its ability to poison Ziegler–Natta catalysts. It is selectively hydrogenated into ethylene, usually using Pd–Ag catalysts.

Until the 1950s, when oil supplanted coal as the chief source of reduced carbon, acetylene (and the aromatic fraction from coal tar) was the main source of organic chemicals in the chemical industry. It was prepared by the hydrolysis of calcium carbide, a reaction discovered by Friedrich Wöhler in 1862 and still familiar to students:
 CaC2 + 2H2O -> Ca(OH)2 + C2H_{2 ^}

Calcium carbide production requires extremely high temperatures, ~2000 °C, necessitating the use of an electric arc furnace. In the US, this process was an important part of the late-19th century revolution in chemistry enabled by the massive hydroelectric power project at Niagara Falls.

Bonding
In terms of valence bond theory, in each carbon atom the 2s orbital hybridizes with one 2p orbital thus forming an sp hybrid. The other two 2p orbitals remain unhybridized. The two ends of the two sp hybrid orbital overlap to form a strong σ valence bond between the carbons, while on each of the other two ends hydrogen atoms attach also by σ bonds. The two unchanged 2p orbitals form a pair of weaker π bonds.

Since acetylene is a linear symmetrical molecule, it possesses the D∞h point group.

Physical properties

Changes of state
At atmospheric pressure, acetylene cannot exist as a liquid and does not have a melting point. The triple point on the phase diagram corresponds to the melting point (−80.8 °C) at the minimal pressure at which liquid acetylene can exist (1.27 atm). At temperatures below the triple point, solid acetylene can change directly to the vapour (gas) by sublimation. The sublimation point at atmospheric pressure is −84.0 °C.

Other
At room temperature, the solubility of acetylene in acetone is 27.9 g per kg. For the same amount of dimethylformamide (DMF), the solubility is 51 g. At
20.26 bar, the solubility increases to 689.0 and 628.0 g for acetone and DMF, respectively. These solvents are used in pressurized gas cylinders.

Applications

Welding
Approximately 20% of acetylene is supplied by the industrial gases industry for oxyacetylene gas welding and cutting due to the high temperature of the flame. Oxyacetylene is the hottest burning common fuel gas. Oxy-acetylene welding was a popular welding process in previous decades. The development and advantages of arc-based welding processes have made oxy-fuel welding nearly extinct for many applications. Acetylene usage for welding has dropped significantly. On the other hand, oxy-acetylene welding equipment is quite versatile – not only because the torch is preferred for some sorts of iron or steel welding (as in certain artistic applications), but also because it lends itself easily to brazing, braze-welding, metal heating (for annealing or tempering, bending or forming), the loosening of corroded nuts and bolts, and other applications. Bell Canada cable-repair technicians still use portable acetylene-fuelled torch kits as a soldering tool for sealing lead sleeve splices in manholes and in some aerial locations. Oxyacetylene welding may also be used in areas where electricity is not readily accessible. Oxyacetylene cutting is used in many metal fabrication shops. For use in welding and cutting, the working pressures must be controlled by a regulator, since above , if subjected to a shockwave (caused, for example, by a flashback), acetylene decomposes explosively into hydrogen and carbon.

Portable lighting

Acetylene combustion produces a strong, bright light and the ubiquity of carbide lamps drove much acetylene commercialization in the early 20th century. Common applications included coastal lighthouses, street lights, and automobile and mining headlamps. In most of these applications, direct combustion is a fire hazard, and so acetylene has been replaced, first by incandescent lighting and many years later by low-power/high-lumen LEDs. Nevertheless, acetylene lamps remain in limited use in remote or otherwise inaccessible areas and in countries with a weak or unreliable central electric grid.

Plastics and acrylic acid derivatives
Acetylene can be semihydrogenated to ethylene, providing a feedstock for a variety of polyethylene plastics. Another major application of acetylene, especially in China is its conversion to acrylic acid derivatives. These derivatives form products such as acrylic fibers, glasses, paints, resins, and polymers.

Except in China, use of acetylene as a chemical feedstock has declined by 70% from 1965 to 2007 owing to cost and environmental considerations.

Niche applications
In 1881, the Russian chemist Mikhail Kucherov described the hydration of acetylene to acetaldehyde using catalysts such as mercury(II) bromide. Before the advent of the Wacker process, this reaction was conducted on an industrial scale.

The polymerization of acetylene with Ziegler–Natta catalysts produces polyacetylene films. Polyacetylene, a chain of CH centres with alternating single and double bonds, was one of the first discovered organic semiconductors. Its reaction with iodine produces a highly electrically conducting material. Although such materials are not useful, these discoveries led to the developments of organic semiconductors, as recognized by the Nobel Prize in Chemistry in 2000 to Alan J. Heeger, Alan G MacDiarmid, and Hideki Shirakawa.

In the 1920s, pure acetylene was experimentally used as an inhalation anesthetic.

Acetylene is sometimes used for carburization (that is, hardening) of steel when the object is too large to fit into a furnace.

Acetylene is used to volatilize carbon in radiocarbon dating. The carbonaceous material in an archeological sample is treated with lithium metal in a small specialized research furnace to form lithium carbide (also known as lithium acetylide). The carbide can then be reacted with water, as usual, to form acetylene gas to feed into a mass spectrometer to measure the isotopic ratio of carbon-14 to carbon-12.

Natural occurrence
The energy richness of the C≡C triple bond and the rather high solubility of acetylene in water make it a suitable substrate for bacteria, provided an adequate source is available. A number of bacteria living on acetylene have been identified. The enzyme acetylene hydratase catalyzes the hydration of acetylene to give acetaldehyde:

C2H2 + H2O -> CH3CHO

Acetylene is a moderately common chemical in the universe, often associated with the atmospheres of gas giants. One curious discovery of acetylene is on Enceladus, a moon of Saturn. Since such temperatures are highly unlikely on such a small distant body, this discovery is potentially suggestive of catalytic reactions within that moon, making it a promising site to search for prebiotic chemistry.

Reactions

Vinylation reactions
In 'vinylation reactions, H−X compounds add across the triple bond. Alcohols and phenols add to acetylene to give vinyl ethers. Thiols give vinyl thioethers. Similarly, vinylpyrrolidone and vinylcarbazole are produced industrially by vinylation of 2-pyrrolidone and carbazole.

The hydration of acetylene is a vinylation reaction, but the resulting vinyl alcohol isomerizes to acetaldehyde. The reaction is catalyzed by mercury salts. This reaction once was the dominant technology for acetaldehyde production, but it has been displaced by the Wacker process, which affords acetaldehyde by oxidation of ethylene, a cheaper feedstock. A similar situation applies to the conversion of acetylene to the valuable vinyl chloride by hydrochlorination vs the oxychlorination of ethylene.

Vinyl acetate is used instead of acetylene for some vinylations, which are more accurately described as transvinylations.  Higher esters of vinyl acetate have been used in the synthesis of vinyl formate.

Ethynylation
Acetylene adds to aldehydes and ketones to form α-ethynyl alcohols: 

The reaction with formaldehyde is used industrially in the production of butynediol, forming propargyl alcohol as the by-product. Copper acetylide is used as the catalyst.

Because halogens add across the triple bond, the substituted acetylenes difluoroacetylene, dichloroacetylene, dibromoacetylene, and diiodoacetylene cannot be made directly from acetylene.  A common workaround is to dehydrate vinyl dihaloethenols.

Carbonylation
Walter Reppe discovered that in the presence of catalysts, acetylene reacts to give a wide range of industrially significant chemicals.

With carbon monoxide, acetylene reacts to give acrylic acid, or acrylic esters, which can be used to produce acrylic glass.

Organometallic chemistry
Acetylene and its derivatives (2-butyne, diphenylacetylene, etc.) form complexes with transition metals. Its bonding to the metal is somewhat similar to that of ethylene complexes. These complexes are intermediates in many catalytic reactions such as alkyne trimerisation to benzene, tetramerization to cyclooctatetraene, and carbonylation to hydroquinone:

Fe(CO)5 + 4 C2H2 + 2 H2O -> 2 C6H4(OH)2 + FeCO3 at basic conditions (50–, 20–).

In the presence of certain transition metals, alkynes undergo alkyne metathesis.

Metal acetylides, species of the formula , are also common. Copper(I) acetylide and silver acetylide can be formed in aqueous solutions with ease due to a poor solubility equilibrium.

Acid-base reactions

Acetylene has a pKa of 25, acetylene can be deprotonated by a superbase to form an acetylide:

 HC#CH + RM -> RH + HC#CM

Various organometallic and inorganic reagents are effective.

Safety and handling
Acetylene is not especially toxic, but when generated from calcium carbide, it can contain toxic impurities such as traces of phosphine and arsine, which give it a distinct garlic-like smell. It is also highly flammable, as are most light hydrocarbons, hence its use in welding. Its most singular hazard is associated with its intrinsic instability, especially when it is pressurized: under certain conditions acetylene can react in an exothermic addition-type reaction to form a number of products, typically benzene and/or vinylacetylene, possibly in addition to carbon and hydrogen. Most regulators and pressure gauges on equipment report gauge pressure, and the safe limit for acetylene therefore is 101 kPagage, or 15 psig. It is therefore supplied and stored dissolved in acetone or dimethylformamide (DMF), contained in a gas cylinder with a porous filling (Agamassan), which renders it safe to transport and use, given proper handling. Acetylene cylinders should be used in the upright position to avoid withdrawing acetone during use.

Information on safe storage of acetylene in upright cylinders is provided by the OSHA, Compressed Gas Association, United States Mine Safety and Health Administration (MSHA), EIGA, and other agencies.

Copper catalyses the decomposition of acetylene, and as a result acetylene should not be transported in copper pipes.

Cylinders should be stored in an area segregated from oxidizers to avoid exacerbated reaction in case of fire/leakage. Acetylene cylinders should not be stored in confined spaces, enclosed vehicles, garages, and buildings, to avoid unintended leakage leading to explosive atmosphere. In the US, National Electric Code (NEC) requires consideration for hazardous areas including those where acetylene may be released during accidents or leaks. Consideration may include electrical classification and use of listed Group A electrical components in USA. Further information on determining the areas requiring special consideration is in NFPA 497. In Europe, ATEX also requires consideration for hazardous areas where flammable gases may be released during accidents or leaks.

References

External links

Acetylene Production Plant and Detailed Process 
Acetylene at Chemistry Comes Alive!

Movie explaining acetylene formation from calcium carbide and the explosive limits forming fire hazards
Calcium Carbide & Acetylene at The Periodic Table of Videos (University of Nottingham)
CDC – NIOSH Pocket Guide to Chemical Hazards – Acetylene

 
Alkynes
Fuel gas
Industrial gases
Synthetic fuel technologies
Explosive chemicals
Explosive gases